The Union of Evangelical Congregational Churches in Portugal is a congregational church in Portugal, a member of the World Evangelical Congregational Fellowship.

Its headquarters is located in Lisbon. In 2004 it has 23 congregations, eight house fellowships and 300 members.

References

Protestantism in Portugal
Congregationalism
Reformed denominations in Europe